Föhn Bastion is a landmark mountain rising to  about  southeast of Cape Jeremy, on the Rymill Coast of Palmer Land, Antarctica. It was named by the UK Antarctic Place-Names Committee in 1977 in association with other wind names in this area. The Föhn is the descending warm wind common in the European Alps.

References 

Mountains of Palmer Land